Immortals is a 1998 anthology of science fiction  short stories edited by American writers Jack Dann and Gardner Dozois.

Contents 
Learning to Be Me by Greg Egan
Grotto of the Dancing Deer by Clifford D. Simak
Child of All Ages by P. J. Plauger
The Worm That Flies by Brian W. Aldiss
The Secret by Jack Vance
The Dying Man by Damon Knight
Death Do Us Part by Robert Silverberg
Mortimer Gray's History of Death by Brian Stableford

External links 

1998 anthologies
Jack Dann and Gardner Dozois Ace anthologies
Ace Books books